The North Carolina State House was built from 1792 to 1796 as the state capitol for North Carolina. It was located at Union Square in the state capital, Raleigh, in Wake County. The building was extensively renovated in the neoclassical style by William Nichols, the state architect, from 1820 to 1824. On December 24, 1821, the statue of George Washington by Antonio Canova was displayed in the rotunda. Both were destroyed by fire in 1831.

History
In 1792, Union Square in Raleigh was set as the location for the state capitol. The General Assembly first met here in 1794. The original two-story brick state house was completed in 1796.

On December 16, 1815, several months after the American success in the War of 1812, the House of Commons, and the Senate soon afterwards, unanimously resolved to  commission, with no limit on expense, a statue of George Washington for the state house. Governor William Miller asked U.S. senators James Turner and Nathaniel Macon to find the best sculptor for this work. While William Thornton and Benjamin H. Latrobe, designers of the United States Capitol, thought it could be done in the United States, Joseph Hopkinson and Thomas Jefferson highly recommended Antonio Canova of Rome, Italy.

In 1816, the state commissioned a copy of Gilbert Stuart's Lansdowne portrait of Washington to be painted by Thomas Sully. The painting was displayed in the state house in 1818. In 1819, the state commissioned The Passage of the Delaware by Sully, but its dimensions were too large  to fit in the state house. This painting is now at the Museum of Fine Arts, Boston.

To accommodate Canova's George Washington, William Nichols was hired in 1818 as the state architect to redesign and enlarge the state house by adding a third floor and two wings. He created a neoclassical building in the style of the United States Capitol, combining Palladian and Greek Revival architectures. The construction was done from 1820 to 1824. The original cupola was replaced with a central dome and rotunda for the statue. The statue arrived in Raleigh on December 24, 1821 and was installed that same day as part of an official ceremony. It was attended by Governor Jesse Franklin and the legislature. Colonel William Polk, an officer in the American Revolutionary War, addressed the audience in the dedication speech, as reported in The Raleigh Register on December 28, starting:

On June 21, 1831, while working to fireproof the building, workers accidentally set the roof on fire. Following the major fire of May 29 in Fayetteville, the state had decided to protect the wooden roof of the state house with zinc sheets. The accident occurred while soldering the nail heads to the zinc. The resulting destruction of both the state house and Canova's statue was described in The Raleigh Register on June 23 as follows: 

As the blaze burned from the roof towards the bottom of the building, North Carolina Secretary of State William Hill had time to save a significant amount of state documents, carrying them out of his office to the adjacent Union Square. From 1833 to 1840, a new North Carolina State Capitol was built on the same site. It also included a central domed rotunda, which now has a copy of Canova's statue. The Sully painting of Washington was rescued from the fire and reinstalled in the new building.

Gallery

References

Bibliography

External links
 
 

Government buildings with domes
Demolished buildings and structures in North Carolina
William Nichols buildings
Burned buildings and structures in the United States
Neoclassical architecture in North Carolina